The 2023 Rugby League European Championship will be the 34th edition of the Rugby League European Championship, and the inaugural edition of the promotion and relegation era of the tournament after the cancellation of the planned first edition in 2020 due to the COVID-19 pandemic.

Background
The tournament will act as qualification for 2025 Rugby League World Cup, with the top team from each group of Euro A, outside of France and England (who have already qualified), will qualify for the 2025 World Cup. The second placed team from each group will enter a playoff with one of the group winners from Euro B for the final two European places.

Qualification

Group stage
The draw for the tournament was made on 22 February 2023 in Huddersfield by Lisa McIntosh and Michelle Hargreaves.

Group A

Group B

Final

See also 
2023 Rugby League European Championship B

Notes

References 

European rugby league competitions
2023 in rugby league